Levroux is a commune in the Indre department in central France, to the north of Châteauroux. On 1 January 2016, the former commune of Saint-Martin-de-Lamps was merged into Levroux. On 1 January 2019, the former commune Saint-Pierre-de-Lamps was merged into Levroux. Its Porte de Champagne fortified gateway is the only survivor of its seven gates. Levroux is famous for its local delicacy of goats' cheese.

Population

See also
Communes of the Indre department

References

Communes of Indre
Berry, France
Bituriges Cubi